The 1975 San Diego mayoral election was held on September 16, 1975 to elect the mayor for San Diego. Incumbent Pete Wilson stood for reelection.

Municipal elections in California are officially non-partisan, though some candidates do receive funding and support from various political parties. The non-partisan primary was held September 16, 1975. Wilson received a majority of the votes in the primary and was reelected mayor with no need for a runoff election.

Candidates
Pete Wilson, Mayor of San Diego
Lee Hubbard, member of the San Diego City Council
Otis Jones, lawyer
John Kelley, writer and perennial candidate
Kenny Olson, business owner and perennial candidate

Campaign
Incumbent Mayor Pete Wilson stood for reelection to a second term. Similar to his 1971 campaign, Wilson campaigned on a platform of controlling growth and preventing Los Angeles style sprawl. Other issues Wilson campaigned on included relocating the city airport from Lindbergh Field to Otay Mesa and opposing collective bargaining for public employees. Wilson's only opponent with prior experience in elected office was Council Member Lee Hubbard, owner of a concrete contracting firm. Hubbard stood as a more pro-growth candidate. He also opposed Wilson's support for relocating the airport and was in favor of limited labor rights for city employees.

In the September 16, 1975 primary election, Wilson was reelected mayor with 61.7 percent of the vote. Hubbard came in second with 31.9 percent of the vote. The remaining vote was split among three minor candidates. Because Wilson was elected outright in the primary, no runoff election was held.

Primary election results

General election
Because Wilson was reelected mayor with a majority of the votes in the primary, no runoff election was held.

References

1975
1975 California elections
1975 United States mayoral elections
1975
November 1975 events in the United States